Océane Avocat Gros (born 23 April 1997) is a French ski jumper. She has competed at World Cup level since the 2016/17 season, with her best individual World Cup result being 19th place in Pyeongchang on 15 February 2017. At the 2013 Junior World Championships, she won a team silver medal.

References

1997 births
Living people
French female ski jumpers
People from Bonneville, Haute-Savoie
Sportspeople from Haute-Savoie